The 1988-89 NBA season was the Kings' 40th season in the NBA and fourth in Sacramento. It was also the franchise's first season at the new ARCO Arena, after playing the previous three seasons at the original ARCO Arena, as well as the team's first season in the Pacific Division of the NBA's Western Conference. During the off-season, the Kings acquired Rodney McCray from the Houston Rockets, and acquired Randy Wittman from the Atlanta Hawks. At midseason, the team traded Ed Pinckney and Joe Kleine to the Boston Celtics in exchange for Danny Ainge and Brad Lohaus, and dealt Wittman and LaSalle Thompson to the Indiana Pacers in exchange for Wayman Tisdale. The Kings held a 14–32 record at the All-Star break, and finished sixth in the Pacific Division with a 27–55 record.

Second-year guard Kenny Smith averaged 17.3 points, 7.7 assists and 1.3 steals per game, while McCray averaged 12.6 points, 7.6 rebounds and 4.3 assists per game, and Harold Pressley provided the team with 12.3 points and 6.1 rebounds per game. In addition, top draft pick Ricky Berry contributed 11.0 points per game, and Jim Petersen provided with 10.2 points and 6.3 rebounds per game. 

Following the season, Petersen was traded to the Golden State Warriors, and Lohaus left in the 1989 NBA Expansion Draft.

Draft picks

Roster

Regular season

Season standings

z - clinched division title
y - clinched division title
x - clinched playoff spot

Record vs. opponents

Game log

Player statistics

Awards and records

Transactions

References

See also
 1988-89 NBA season

Sacramento Kings seasons
Sacramento
Sacramento
Sacramento